Dark Ages is a MMORPG based on Celtic mythology, originally developed by Nexon and now operated by KRU Interactive. It is loosely based on the Korean game Legend of Darkness. The American version was developed by David Ethan Kennerly who based it somewhat on the works of horror writer H. P. Lovecraft.  The game originally thrived on player involvement in the management of the game and progression of the storyline, even going so far as allowing players control over in-game politics and laws.

Setting
The backstory essentially is that a long time past, the people called Tuatha de Danaan ("Children of Danaan") arrived in the lands of Temuair, meaning Earth-Sea in the Tuathan tongue.  There was formed the civilization called Hy-brasyl.  It was a peaceful time, in harmony with nature.  For the first time, after a millennium of peace had existed, a man is found murdered, and exploration into the outside world begins.  With this comes the harnessing of the elements for magical power.

Along with this exploration, Kadath, the worldly home of the Gods, is discovered.  Dark altars and temples are constructed, and the Priests of these Dark Gods go crazy in their search for Godly knowledge.  In this madness, Hy-brasyl is drowned, with the death of all those who know the forbidden knowledge.

Over 300 years go by until the knowledge is regained, and along with the four other elements (Fire, Earth, Water, Wind), a fifth is discovered: Darkness.  With this discovery come the Dubhaimid, the dark ones.  Formed by the Dark God Chadul, these dark forces terrorize Temuair.  The wise amongst the Tuatha de Danaan return to the worship of the Light Goddess Danaan, who enters into the Great War with Chadul.

Many years later, the Six Lords of Temuair meet to form an unholy Pact with Chadul.  Led by Tenes, King of Ardmagh, the Anaman Pact is formed, granting each of the Lords a 1000-year lifespan and the unity of Temuair.  In the ensuing war, Danaan's chosen Paladin, Ainmeal, fights against Tenes in battle and wins, ending another dark threat.  Ainmeal renames Ardmagh to "Loures."

Again much time of peace passes, until the 4th Empress of Loures, Ealagad, comes to power.  She seeks to rekindle the power of Chadul and does so, restoring the Dubhaimid to Temuair.  Danaan again intervenes, this time by sacrificing Herself in order to defeat Chadul for the final time.  With the end of this Shadows War, the first of the Aislings (Dreamers) are born, free from their old mundane life, and making a difference in the new Atavism Age.

Character customization
Players begin the game with the creation of a new character. They may select a name up to 12 characters long. They may then select the gender and hair color of the character. A limited selection of gender-specific hairstyles is then chosen, eighteen styles for males, seventeen styles for females. Players then enter their desired password and enter the game as the default Peasant class.

Characters are broken up into the archetypal character classes of Warrior, Monk, Priest, Wizard and Rogue, with the default being Peasant. In order to become one of the common classes, players must enter a specific building in the starting town of Mileth. They may bring a player of the desired class to initiate them into the class, or may elect to do so alone, with the NPC as their initiator.

Darkages uses a system of 5 primary stats and 4 secondary stats.  Primary stats start at 3, and 2 primary stat points are gained every time a character increases in level.  These points can be spent to increase a character's stats.  Stats can also be altered by gear worn by the character.  The primary stats are STR (Strength), CON (Constitution), DEX (Dexterity), INT (Intelligence), and WIS (Wisdom).

STR determines the damage of many melee combat skill and assails, the maximum weight limit of gear worn and carried in a character's inventory.  CON determines the amount of health regenerated per cycle, the amount of health gained upon leveling and the damage of certain monk skills.  DEX determines the chance to evade melee attacks, and the damage of some rogue skills.  INT determines the damage inflicted by damage spells. WIS determines the amount of mana regenerated per cycle, mana gained upon leveling, and the amount healed by priest healing spells.

The secondary stats are MR (Magic Resistance), AC (Armor Class), HIT, and DMG (Damage). Secondary stats are modified by gear.

MR determines the odds of a hostile spell missing a character.  Characters start with a base MR of 0.  AC determines how much damage is reduced when dealt to a character.  Characters start with a base AC of 100; improvements to armor class lower the number, while negative effects, such as the curse spell used by Priests, "Ard Cradh", increase armor class.  HIT determines the likelihood of an assail skill hitting. DMG increases the damage of assail skills.  Characters start with a base HIT and DMG of 0.

Learning skills and spells require the character to have a certain amount of each stat, for example for a Warrior to learn the "Windblade" ability he must raise his INT and CON to 5, STR to 6, and DEX to 12. Only then may he learn the ability after presenting the trainer with a specific item(s) and/or gold. Many players plan their character around using items to boost stats so they can learn skills with the fewest points actually spent possible, enabling the excess points to be spent in CON or WIS, allowing the character to enjoy a greatly improved HP or MP pool and regeneration while leveling.

HP and MP are the standards hit point and magic points. HP is reduced from receiving damage in combat from enemies, and if it is reduced to 0 results in the death of the character except under special circumstances. If a character is a member of a party, instead of immediate death the character is in a swooning state in which they cannot move or use skills, spells, potions or complete any action other than speech. It is commonly called Skulling in the game, in reference to the skull which appears over the character head for a short duration. Other characters may use a specialized potion to cancel the effect and return the character to 1 HP during the duration. Otherwise the spell ends and the character dies per usual. HP and MP are increased every time the character gains a level based on a mathematical formula involving the characters CON stat for HP or the characters WIS stat for MP.

Classes
Though a default class, players may choose to advance the Peasant class to level ninety nine. This class has no class specific weapons or armors and receives the benefit of no special class specific skills or spells. Any equipment which a peasant can use and wield can be used or wielded by any of the other classes in the game. This class does however enjoy the benefit of the lowest experience points required to level up balanced by being the most difficult class to level up, having no skills or spells. A peasant may place all one hundred and ninety six points gained from their levels into any of their stats as there is no limit on a peasants stats.

The archetypal fighting class is the Warrior. Warriors excel in hand-to-hand combat and gain the most armor value from their class specific armors. They have a small selection of shields and one handed weapons which only warrior may use and a selection of two handed weapons. This class gains the benefit of the most instant melee skills. Warriors also have a number of class specific combat skills most of which cause damage to targets in combat. Most of these skills have short cooldown periods. The warrior class has a very limited selection of spells, mostly only to attract enemy monsters or assist the characters defense against attack. Warriors smith many common weapons to become lighter and cause more damage.

The Monk is the master of hand-to-hand fighting. They have a very limited selection of class specific weapon, most of which are hand claw type weapons. Monks enjoy a number of class specific skills and spells, most of which are combat skills and used to mitigate their more limited selection of instant melee skills. The monk class has the next highest armor rating of their class specific armors, after warriors. While monks may use any common weapons, many of their class skills require them to have either no weapon or monk-only weapons equipped in order to function. The majority of a monk's combat damage is from their skills. Their spell selection is less limited than the warriors as they have the ability to remove blindness and poison status from themselves or other characters some slight healing spells and defense spells that can provide complete invincibility to damage for a brief amount of time. Monks may also practice herbalism to create potions which have similar effect to their spells. Many of the monk's skills and spells are based on the monk teaching Dugons to other monks. Dugons are similar to the belt system of karate in theory, but progress to the next dugon is based on how many pupils the monk has taught dugons to.

The Rogue' is touted as the intermediate class between the basher classes and the caster classes though the class functions more as a basher. Rogues heavily rely on trap skills which places a damage or status inflicting trap on a tile on which enemies must step. Rogue traps either cause damage or poison, blind or sleep status. Rogues have the ability to hide from monsters and other characters in order to move around without attention. Rogues have a decent ability in hand-to-hand combat and have a number of class specific weapons; melee daggers or thrown daggers and shuriken type weapons called surigams. Rogues may also change the hairstyle of other characters from a selection of around 80 gender specific styles. They have the next strongest armors from monks. Rogues can also smith their class specific weapons to become lighter and cause more damage.

The Priest class has very few abilities in hand-to-hand combat and is a poor melee fighter. Their armors are the second weakest of all common classes. Priests enjoy a very large selection of spells most of which protect themselves or others from danger either through removing of curses which cause armours values to drop, remove most negative status ailments or healing other characters. The class also enjoys a wide variety of spells which cause status ailments of blindness, sleep, poison, frozen in place, or curses which reduce armor values. The priest class also casts a limited selection of direct damage spells, which are based on the Light element. Priest specific weapons are specialized staffs which reduce the waiting time for their spells to discharge. Priests may also create the same potions as monks. They are the only class which can progress beyond Acolyte status in the eight religious shrines.

The Wizard is the archetypal magical attacker. This class also has very few abilities in hand-to-hand combat making them a poor melee fighter. Their amours are the weakest in the game rendering wizards the most susceptible to damage from enemies. Wizards are masters of the elements and most of their spells are based on the four elements of fire, air, earth and water called in the game, respectively; srad, athar, creag and sal. Their spells revolve around causing direct damage with elemental spells, and although a max level wizard can decimate entire legions of foes from afar with a wide variety of potent spells, a wizard who is still in the process of leveling will find it very impractical to attempt to be a damage dealer and will instead only focus on strengthening the elemental affinities of friends and foes—strong spells require lots of stats, nobody expects (or wants) wizards to deal damage in a group setting while leveling, and not pumping WIS will result in a vastly lower MP pool, plus you can just pick up the spells you missed leveling up at 99. For these reasons most wizards plan their character with level 99 in mind and pump their WIS very high as early as possible, resulting in giant mana pools compared to a character that does not. Wizards can also increase the elemental affinity of enemies or allies (a very important mechanic in Dark Ages), and switching the elemental affinities of enemies.  Unfortunately the latter function of forced elemental affinity switching does not work on any enemies the same level or higher than the wizard, rendering it useless against any enemies that a top level wizard would fight. Wizards may learn Dark element spells which cause direct damage in combat. Wizards also gain some spells that steal mp from group members or draw mp from specialized potions which contain the essence of the elements. Wizards can also enchant equipment either to become lighter and make the wearer more likely to successfully strike their opponent, detract less mp from the wearer or grant extra mp to the wearer, make the wearer cause more damage, or get an increase in hp from the gear. Wizards may practice alchemy to create some items. They may also practice necromancy which summons monsters to fight for the wizard. Wizard specific weapons are staffs which predominantly lower the time needed for spells to discharge.

Rededication, mastering and grand mastering
All classes except peasant may either rededicate their class or become a master of their class once they reach level ninety nine in their class. If the character wishes to Master their class, they must obtain specific items used to the "Mastering" process. Rededicating their class means they choose to become one of the other four common classes, losing all their levels and becoming unable to use their old class's weapons and armor, but keeping the abilities learned in the previous class. The correct term for this is Rededication, however this is commonly referred to by players colloquially as "subbing."  Once a character has reached level ninety nine in their class or their new class, they may Master. Mastering grants the ability to raise your stats to the maximum level of their respective class, as well as a specialized weapon and armor. Masters also learn some new class specific skills/spells. Those with only one class, called Pures in the game, gain additional skills or spells which rededicated subs do not receive. Although in the past the pure-only skills were very weak (and even further in the past there were no benefits to staying pure at all,) today the pure-only skills are extremely potent and are finally worth the enormous sacrifice of every pre-99 ability of another class.

Once a character is a master they may turn experience into more HP or MP, and turn any excess HP over a minimum requirement into bonus stats (although the limit for stats is capped based on your class, HP and MP levels are NOT.) Grand mastering is accomplished by completing very long and tough quests that will require the help of friends and rewards you with class-specific equipment that is superior to your Master equipment. There is no title change to "Grand Master" and no new abilities, but the Grand Master equipment is much flashier and much stronger than the Master equipment, and looks differently for Pures and Subs.

Advanced classes
The warrior, monk, rogue, priest and wizard classes may all upgrade their class after mastering and completing the grand master quests. The character may then elect to sacrifice the master and grandmaster weapons and armors and sacrifice some accumulated experience, HP and MP.  Warriors become Gladiators'. Monks become Druids. Rogues become Archers. Priests become Bards. Wizards become Summoners. The class's style of gameplay is altered with the class change, and new skills and spells are gained. Characters also learn the use of new weapons, and may wear new class specific armors in their new class. The advanced classes function similarly to the common classes, albeit instead of accumulating experience to gain levels, the character accumulated ability points to increase ability levels. Certain enemies give ability points as well as experience points when defeated. Some quests give both exp and ap, and some give only ap.

Gameplay
The view in Dark Ages is isometric except when leaving certain zones. Zones will either link to another zone at specific points, or else lead to a world map. When a player leaves a zone and goes onto the world map the player will click map points to change location to a new zone. Some zones may only be clicked by approaching from other specific zones, giving movement a feel of travel. Movement in a zone is based on the cardinal directions, in a skewed view. The Up arrow corresponds to cardinal northeast. Movement is accomplished by turning or moving with the arrow keys or by right clicking tiles on the map to walk to. Combat occurs in real-time, in the standard isometric view, usually in specific hunting grounds. Players may hold the spacebar to attack adjacent enemies with assails. This will cease when the spacebar is released. They may also double right click the target to attack. Double right clicking an enemy will both walk the character to whatever adjacent side is closest, and will use the assail skills until the character faces or moves away, presses the spacebar or is defeated. Skills and spells all appear in a specific window pane, and may either be clicked to activate unless the specific skill or spell also requires targeting. In such a case the player also clicks their mouse on the target. Alternatively, skills or spells which must have a target may be dragged from the skill or spell pane onto the target and the skill or spell is used. The 1 through = keys are hotkeys and may be pressed to use the appropriate skill or spell, subject to the targeting function.

Combat
Much of the focus of gameplay is combat either in hunting grounds or in certain specific PvP areas. There are numerous hunting grounds in Darkages. Many hunting grounds are designed for characters of specific levels or ability levels. They may have a broad or narrow range and may exclude characters above or below the thresholds of entry. Some hunting grounds are for gaining experience only and some are for gaining both experience points and ability points. Some are only opened by completing or engaging in specific quests. Many hunting grounds are only hunted for the items or money that can be acquired therein.

There are three PvP forums in darkages and one team arena. The first, called honour fields, is for solo combat between warriors only in a small arena. The second, called the arena, is for registered players only, and contains the team arena, a free-for-all pvp arena and an arena for hosted matches of one to four teams. The team arena pits two teams against each other fighting for control of three towers and points are accumulated for defeating the other team players, for taking control of a tower and points accumulate over time for each tower controlled. The last PvP forum is the Medenia arena. There are three different zones in the arena and any character registered or not may enter and compete. There is also a PvE quest in this arena for registered characters.

Quests
Quests are accomplished in the routine manner; they are also very few and long; speaking to different NPCs in story arcs, bringing specific items to NPCs or delivering goods from one to another. Many quests involve entering specific hunting grounds and defeating a particular monster which may only be attempted as part of the quest. The amount of quests in darkages is quite limited in comparison to other mmo's. The benefit of quests are varied some granting exp or ap, some give new items. Some quests grant access to new zones.

Religion

Temuair Faiths
Each Temple has a clergy made entirely of players.  Players may hold any of the following ranks:

Probate is the rank of initiated, unregistered players.  It is also the rank of any Priest who has been the target of a heresy action.  These people have the ability to pray when in the Temple of their God.

Worshipper is the rank of initiated, registered players.  These people have the ability to pray in the Temple of their God or when elsewhere, by use of their Prayer Necklace.  They may also be sent on religious geasea by any Priest or higher of their Temple.

Acolyt is the rank of Clergy-Helper.  These people must be appointed by a person of rank Priest or higher.  They have all the abilities of a Worshipper, as well as the ability to summon creatures of their God.  They may also receive Holy Symbols of their God from a Cleric or higher.  If a Priest or a Wizard, they may also receive a Holy or Magus staff of their God.  Acolytes also have the ability to remove an enemy God's blessing from an item.  Acolytes are also the only people who may begin a heresy action, which removes a Priest or higher from power.

Priest is the lowest rank of the actual Clergy, and is obtainable only by members of the Priest class.  To become a Priest, you must have been an Acolyte for two double-moons (two weeks).  Priests have the ability to initiate new worshippers, banish people from the Temple, and consecrate items (adding their God's touch to the item).  They may also invite unregistered people into the Temple.  Priests have the ability to hold a Mass, which gives all present worshippers of the Trinity 50k experience.  Priests can also destroy items if they are touched by an enemy God, or may simply remove the enemy God's touch.  Priests are also able to send Worshippers or higher on Geasea.

Cleric is obtainable only by those who have won a rank of "Clave" or above in any contest.  They must have initiated at least 40 people in order to obtain Cleric alone, or 20 people if assisted by a Minister or higher.  Clerics have all the abilities of a Priest, and may also create Holy Symbols, Holy Staves of their God, and Magus Staves of their God.

Minister is obtainable only by those who have won a rank of "Village" or above in any contest.  They must have initiated at least 40 people in order to obtain Minister alone, or 80 people if assisted by a High Priest.  Ministers have all the abilities of a Cleric.

High Priest is obtainable also by those who have won a rank of "Village" or above in any contest.  They must have initiated at least 160 people into their Temple.  High Priests have all the abilities of a Minister, and may also excommunicate members.  This act will cause the High Priest to lose ten initiations, lose all of his faith, and will forcibly remove any member of the Fellowship from the Fellowship.

Medenian Faiths
The medenian faiths are very simple. The character chooses one of the 3 elemental spirits to offer prayers to. The character may remain a member of a temuair faith while being in a medenian faith. The character may pray to the spirit to increase standing in the faith. When groups of characters pray together under specific circumstances they may be furnished with a special pet or item.

Politics
One of the other unique features of Dark Ages created by David Ethan Kennerly is the political system.  Originally only two towns - Rucesion and Mileth - were involved in the player run politics, but later the separate in-game continent of Medenia has also developed a player-run politic of its very own.  [the following details relate to the original political systems of Rucesion and Mileth only].  An update to the game in 2017 reduced clout requirements to hold political office.  Clout is a meta-currency stored on a character's legend, and is gained through other players "voting", which can be done once per 12 hours, or through winning a contest.

Respected Citizen is not a true political position.  It requires 5 clout (previously 10), and it requires that you have mentored at least one person.  You gain the ability to admit people as citizens of your town, and the ability to dye clothing with the help of another tailor.

Judicial Branch
Guard is a rank where the holder enforces the town's laws.  Guards must have been a Respected Citizen for at least one term, and require 10 clout (previously 25) to take office.  They may banish any person from their town for 24 hours.  They may also sponsor others to run for political office.  They wear a green or blue tabard, depending on what town they are from.

Guard Captain is a rank above Guard.  Guard Captains must have four terms of Guard, and require 20 clout (previously 50) to take office.  They have the same abilities as a Guard, and wear the same tabard with the addition of a helmet indicating their higher status.  They organize the Guards, hold meetings, and review cases brought to them.

Judge is the highest judicial rank.  Judges must have held four terms of Guard Captain and require 25 clout (previously 100) to take office.  They may hold trials, which is where citizens try to appeal banishments and exiles.  These trials involve a jury, prosecutor, and defendant.  They may also sponsor others to run for political office.  Judges wear a fluffy robe colored with their town's color.  Judges may perform the same functions as Guards and Guard Captains, as well as order exiles, removals of bad officials, and barment from office.  They may also order a player be Sgathed, which is a form of capital punishment for the worst offenders.

Legislative Branch
Demagogue is the lowest rank of the Legislative Branch.  Demagogues must have held four terms of Respected Citizen, and require 20 clout (previously 50) to take office.  They may make the town's laws, and also may exile people from their town permanently upon a Judge's order. Demagogues may also sponsor others for political office.  Demagogues wear a full-body robe of their town's color.

Burgess is the highest rank of the Legislative Branch.  Burgesses must have held four terms of Demagogue and require 50 clout (previously 200) to take office.  They have the same power as Demagogues, but are often granted other responsibilities and powers by the town's laws.

Outside the towns
Outside of the towns, there are two other forces that uphold Mundane Mandate (Terms of Service).  The ones that do the actual ToS-enforcement are a group called the Rangers.  They can be recognized by their yellow tabards.  They have the ability to jail people for violating the Terms of Service, and arrest individuals for automated improvement of skills and spells.  Both a jailing and an arrest place a player in a jail cell in the dungeon of the capital city.  Players that have been jailed will be confined to the cell for four hours to 7 days, depending on the number of jails accumulated.  Players who have been arrested may walk out of the jail cell at any point.  Once you reach a certain number of arrests, you may be blocked from the game; currently, reaching a total of six jails and/or arrests will result in losing access to your character for a period of time.

The other force is the Knights, who act as KRU's agents in the game.  They handle player requests and ideas.  However, they also report extreme abuses to KRU directly.  ToS violations outside of player run towns are the exclusive remit of Rangers. Knights and to a certain extent rangers are appointed through nomination and merit, respectively.

Nobility
There is a contest system in Dark Ages. The players enter works of literature or art as a contest entry, to be judged by previous winners. The game developers have a final say on what award specific content is awarded. Players submit their entries in different categories. Literature' entries are short stories or poetry relating to the theme of the game or characters in the game world. History entries are stories written as historical documents which relate to the story-line of the game and may influence the plots of content released by the developer. Lore entries are compendiums of factual technical information relating to the game; item lists, monsters statistics, maps and such things. Philosophy entries are philosophical theories of the role-played character, relating to the game world and how the character relates to it. Art entries are any works of art the player has created that have a basis in the theme of the game world. Drawings or paintings of the imagined settings or characters or monsters, sculptures of game figures, web comics or animation etc. The music category was removed from the contest system, though works of music could perhaps be entered as art entries. Players who create these works may choose to enter them after attaining education points from attending make believe classes hosted by previous contest winners. Players gain in game rewards after winning a contest. They may also form new guilds, teach in the college themselves, and judge new contest entries upon becoming a noble. Nobles also have the power to remove people from the college area, and denounce other nobles which can remove their awards. Noble priests have the right to advance further in their respective religions.

External links
 Official site

Massively multiplayer online role-playing games
1999 video games
Nexon games
Persistent worlds
Video games based on Celtic mythology
Video games developed in South Korea
Windows games
Windows-only games